The European Committee for Banking Standards (ECBS) was formed in December 1992  by leading European banking associations to enhance the European technical banking infrastructure by developing standards.  In 2006 its functions were taken over by the European Payments Council and the committee was disbanded.

Its website is now maintained by an independent group the European Banking Resources.

References

Financial regulation
Regulation in the European Union